Hydroides is a genus of tube-forming serpulid worms found on submerged saltwater rocks, shells, and boats in many coastal areas around the world.

Species
It contains the following species:
 Hydroides bispinosa (Bush, 1910)
 Hydroides brachyacantha (Rioja, 1863)
 Hydroides crucigera (Moerch, 1863)
 Hydroides dianthus (Verrill, 1873)
 Hydroides dirampha (Mörch, 1863)
 Hydroides elegans (Haswell, 1883)
 Hydroides ezoensis (Okuda, 1934)
 Hydroides huanghaiensis (Sun & Yang, 2000)
 Hydroides lirs (Kupriyanova, Sun, ten Hove, Wong & Rouse, 2015)
 Hydroides longispinosa (Chen & Wu, 1980)
 Hydroides microtis (Mörch, 1863)
 Hydroides norvegica (Gunnerus, 1768)
 Hydroides parva (Treadwell, 1902)
 Hydroides protulicola (Benedict, 1887)
 Hydroides sanctaecrucis (Krøyer in Mörch, 1863)
 Hydroides xishaensis (Chen & Wu, 1978)

Ecology
Parasites of Hydroides include sea snails from the genus Fargoa.

References

External links
 A new introduced fouling organism in Sydney Harbour
 MBL Marine Organisms Database page
 Joint Nature Conservation Committee (JNCC)-U.K. on H. ezoensis

Serpulidae
Polychaete genera
Taxa named by Johan Ernst Gunnerus